Manabu Fujita (born 22 March 1933) is a Japanese basketball player. He competed in the men's tournament at the 1956 Summer Olympics.

References

External links
 

1933 births
Living people
Japanese men's basketball players
Olympic basketball players of Japan
Basketball players at the 1956 Summer Olympics
Place of birth missing (living people)
Asian Games medalists in basketball
Asian Games bronze medalists for Japan
Basketball players at the 1958 Asian Games
Medalists at the 1958 Asian Games
20th-century Japanese people
21st-century Japanese people